Jacobus Abraham du Rand  (better known as Salty du Rand) (16 January 1926 – 27 February 1979) was a former South African rugby union footballer. He played numerous times for South Africa, including on their 1951–52 Grand Slam tour of Europe, as well as captaining them once against the All Blacks.

Playing career
He made his debut for the Springboks in 1949 in a Test match against the All Blacks, which was played at Ellis Park in Johannesburg. The game was won by South Africa, defeating the New Zealanders 12 to six. South Africa also won the subsequent contest in Durban, defeating the All Blacks again, nine points to three.

In 1951 he was capped three times for the Springboks, who went on a tour of Europe. The first Test he played in on tour was against Scotland at Murrayfield in late November, which the Springboks won 44 points to nil, in which he scored his first try in a Test. He then played in the 17–5 victory over Ireland at Lansdowne Road and the 6 to 3 win over Wales in Cardiff.

The tour continued into early 1952, and du Rand was capped in matches against England at Twickenham, which the Springboks won 8 to three, and then against France, where South Africa won 25 to three, and thus, completed a grand slam of Europe.

He was then chosen to play in a four match series against the Wallabies in 1953, scoring a try in the first Test at Ellis Park, which South Africa won 25 to three. He also scored in the following Test, and played in the two other games as well.

In 1955. the British Lions came to South Africa. Du Rand played in all four Tests. The following season he was capped twice against the Wallabies, both of which the Springboks won. The tour then continued to New Zealand, and du Rand captained South Africa against the All Blacks on July 14 at Carisbrook. He was capped another three times against the All Blacks, playing his last Test for South Africa on September 1 at Eden Park. He died in 1979.

See also
List of South Africa national rugby union players – Springbok no. 281

References

1926 births
1979 deaths
South African rugby union players
South Africa international rugby union players
Rugby union players from the Eastern Cape
Rugby union flankers
Rugby union locks
Western Province (rugby union) players
Blue Bulls players